WEXR (106.9 FM) is a radio station broadcasting in the Meridian, Mississippi, area. Its transmitter is located on Mississippi Highway 145 south of Meridian.
WEXR is part of the Alert FM digital alert and messaging system for Lauderdale County first responders.

In September 2011 WKZB was donated to Meridian Community College.

On September 9, 2011 WKZB changed its callsign to WEXR and changed formats from classic hits to college radio, branded as "The Eagle".

References

External links

EXR